The 1948 Delaware Fightin' Blue Hens football team was an American football team that represented the University of Delaware as an independent during the 1948 college football season. In its sixth season under head coach William D. Murray, the team compiled a 5–3 record and outscored opponents by a total of 107 to 95. Robert Campbell and Eugene Carrell were the team captains. The team played its home games at Wilmington Park in Wilmington, Delaware.

Schedule

References

Delaware
Delaware Fightin' Blue Hens football seasons
Delaware Fightin' Blue Hens football